The Turul is a mythological bird of prey, mostly depicted as a Falcon, in Hungarian tradition and Turkic tradition, and a national symbol of Hungarians.

Origin
The Turul is probably based on a large falcon. The Hungarian language  word turul meant one kind of falcon and the origin of the word is currently thought to be most likely Turkic (Clauson 1972: 472.) (Róna-Tas et al. 2011:2: 954-56)), which is the language of origin of over 10% of words in modern Hungarian lexicon and the exonym "Hungarian" and the word "Hun". Toġrïl or toğrul means a medium to large bird of prey of the family Accipitridae, goshawk or red kite.  In Hungarian the word sólyom means falcon, and there are three ancient words describing different kinds of falcons: kerecsen [Greek κερχνηίς] (saker falcon), zongor [Turkish sungur = gyrfalcon] (which survives in the male name Csongor) and turul.

In the legend of Emese, recorded in the Gesta Hungarorum and the Chronicon Pictum, the turul is mentioned as occurring in a dream of Emese, when she was already pregnant.
In older literature, this was interpreted as "impregnation", but the text is clear. The Turul's role is one of a protector spirit, that protects the little baby Álmos, from harm. This is a very similar motif to the role of the Simurgh in the Iranian epic Shahnameh. In a second dream by the leader of the Hungarian tribes, in which eagles (the emblem of the Pechenegs, enemies of the Hungarians) attacked their horses and the Turul came and saved them.The image of the Turul and its role is similar to that of the Norse Vedfolnir, which like it perched on the tree of life. The Huns reportedly also used the image of the eagle, which for them symbolized the leader. The image of a bird of prey was extremely popular in Saka-Scythian culture. More broadly, this image was common among the nomads of Central Asia. Rather than belonging to a specific ethnic group, it was widespread across the steppe, and the union of a falcon and a woman is "firmly located in a shamanic religio-mythical universe." A prominent example among similar legends is that of the Mongols, contained in The Secret History of the Mongols, where Genghis Khan's mother-in-law dreams that an eagle holding the sun and the moon in its claws lands on her hand, in anticipation of the birth of the Mongolian royal dynasty. In some parts of Kazakhstan and Kyrgyzstan, Kazakhs and Kyrgyz carry falcons inside the yurt during childbirth, because their eyes are said to stave off demons that attack pregnant women during childbirth. Macdonald calls it a "practical use" of the falcons' association with fertility.

A pair of silver disk with Turul motive was found in Rakamaz, Hungary from a 10th century Hungarian cemetery. The most beautiful ornament of noble Hungarian women was a pair of decorative disks hanging from the end of the hair braid.

Turul dynasty

In Hungarian tradition, it originated as the clan symbol used in the 9th and 10th centuries by the ruling Árpád dynasty. The Árpád dynasty was the ruling dynasty of the Principality of Hungary in the 9th and 10th centuries and of the Kingdom of Hungary from 1000 to 1301. The Árpád dynasty is also referred to as the Turul dynasty. 

The Gesta Hunnorum et Hungarorum mentioned that the Árpád dynasty descended from the gens (clan) Turul, and the Gesta Hungarorum recorded that the Árpád's totemic ancestor was the Turul.

In the legend of Emese, recorded in the Gesta Hungarorum and the Chronicon Pictum, the Turul is mentioned as occurring in a dream of Emese, when she was already pregnant.

According the Gesta Hunnorum et Hungarorum, King Attila had the Turul bird on his shield and it was the military badge of the Hungarians until the time of Prince Géza.

Coat of arms of Transylvania 

The first heraldic representations of Transylvania date from the 16th century. The Diet of 1659 codified the representation of the Union of the Three Nations in Transylvania's coat of arms. It depicted a black eagle, a Turul on a blue background, representing the Hungarians, the Sun and the Moon representing the Székelys, and seven red towers on a yellow background representing the seven fortified cities of the Transylvanian Saxons. The flag and coat of arms of Transylvania were granted by Queen Maria Theresa in 1765, when she established a Grand Principality within the Habsburg monarchy.

Modern use 

The Turul is used as in the design of coats of arms of the Hungarian Defence Forces, the Counter Terrorism Centre and the Office of National Security. The central element of the emblem of the Hungarian Defence Forces is the Turul bird with extended wings holding the sword of King Saint Stephen in its claws.

There were 3 large Turul statues, each with a wingspan of 15 metres, in Kingdom of Hungary (before the country had its borders reconfigured by the Treaty of Trianon). The last of the three stands on a mountain near Tatabánya, Hungary, but the other two were destroyed. It is the largest bird statue in Europe, and the largest bronze statue in Central Europe.
There remain at least 195 Turul statues in Hungary, as well as 48 in Romania (32 in Transylvania and 16 in Partium), 8 in Slovakia, 7 in Serbia, 5 in Ukraine, 1 in Austria and 1 in Croatia. One of the most recently erected, on St Michael the Archangel's Day, is in Hungary's Ópusztaszer National Heritage Park.

Some of the Kingdom of Hungary postage stamps issued after 1900 feature the Turul.

Gallery

See also 
 Árpád dynasty
 National symbols of Hungary
 Flag and coat of arms of Transylvania
 Attila
 Tughril
 Simurgh
 Konrul
 Triple-headed eagle

References

Notes

External links 

https://www.kozterkep.hu/gyujtemenyek/megtekintes/5cbd630d4314f24909213f73/turulmadarak

Mythological birds of prey
Heraldic birds
Monuments and memorials in Hungary
National symbols of Hungary
Hungarian legendary creatures
Turkic legendary creatures
Tengriism